The Children's Literature Prize "Fondazione Cassa di Risparmio di Cento" is an international competition aimed at authors of children's books (elementary and middle school) in Italian, original or translated.

Origins
The Prize Cento was established in 1979 on the initiative of the Cassa di Risparmio di Cento and the Faculty of Education at the University of Ferrara. Initially the winner was determined by a panel of experts chaired by Gianni Rodari; the current method of selection was adopted in 1981.

The award is currently sponsored and organized by the Fondazione Cassa di Risparmio di Cento, with the support of the Region of Emilia-Romagna, the Province of Ferrara, the City of Cento, of the University of Ferrara and Bologna.

Method of selection
The competition includes a first phase of selection among all entries of two sets of finalists by a Selection Committee consisting of: Guido Clericetti (cartoonist and scriptwriter), Fulvia Sisti (journalist), Giovanni Genovesi (University of Ferrara), Mario Schiavato (writer), Franco Frabboni (University of Bologna), Tiziana Ferrario (journalist), Paolo Valentini (journalist) and Folco Quilici (documentary filmmaker). To determine the final ranking and then the winners, a second phase involves two juries, one made up of students in the last three grades of elementary school, the other of students in the first three years of secondary school.

The top three authors in the two sections, are awarded respectively € 5,000, € 2,000 and € 1,000.

Curiosity
Among the best known writers to have won the Prize Cento are Roberto Piumini (1979 and 1995), Bianca Pitzorno (1988), Daniel Pennac (1993), Susanna Tamaro (1995), and J. K. Rowling (1998).

Hall of Fame

Notes

External links
premioletteraturaragazzi.com

Italian literary awards
Children's literary awards
Awards established in 1979
1979 establishments in Italy